Nkosinathi Nhleko (born 24 July 1979, in Ermelo) is a retired South African soccer player who last played as a striker for Kaizer Chiefs and Retired at Antaliay Football Club (Turkey Football League)

Nhleko was a stocky built striker known for his pace and ability to hold up the ball and turn defenders not so much for his goal scoring exploits.

Club career 
Nhleko began his professional career with South African club Jomo Cosmos, for whom he played from 1998 to 2002.

In 2002, Nhleko moved to Brann of Norway; although he appeared in 20 games, including two UEFA Cup matches, Nhleko had trouble adjusting to the climate and environment at Brann, and during the summer of 2003, was loaned to Major League Soccer's Dallas Burn for the rest of the season.

Nhleko performed well in 11 games with the Burn, showing strength and power possessed by few MLS forwards, registering two goals and four assists while teaming well with Eddie Johnson.  The team bought Nhleko in the 2004 offseason for a nominal fee, and he played a larger role in the team's 2004 offense.  Appearing either as a substitute for Jason Kreis or a starter with Eddie Johnson, Nhleko played in 23 games for Dallas in 2004, 13 of them starts, while scoring six goals and two assists. He left the team after the season, coming back to the Cosmos.

He arrived for his second spell at Jomo Cosmos in January 2005 but his stay was short lived as he moved back to Europe, where he was signed by Roy Hodgson.

In July 2005, Nhleko returned to Norway to play for Viking. He helped Viking by scoring to beat AS Monaco and Slavia Prague in the 2005 Uefa cup.

In August 2006 he was sold to Swedish club Hammarby IF. In August 2007 he was loaned out to Sandefjord until November 2007. He returned to Jomo Cosmos

His third stint at Jomo Cosmos proved to be fruitless. He failed to score a single league goal in a team who were struggling to find goals to fight off relegation. He did however score a cup goal in a 1–0 win over Golden Arrows in a Nedbank Cup Last 32 Round match.

After Jomo Cosmos relegation from the Premier Soccer League during the 2007/08 season, Nhleko signed for Thanda Royal Zulu on a Bosman free transfer.

International career 
Nhleko has made ten appearances scoring one goal for the South African national team, playing in the 2004 African Nations Cup.

International Goals

External links 

1979 births
Living people
People from Ermelo, Mpumalanga
South African soccer players
South Africa international soccer players
Jomo Cosmos F.C. players
SK Brann players
FC Dallas players
Viking FK players
Hammarby Fotboll players
Sandefjord Fotball players
Kaizer Chiefs F.C. players
Thanda Royal Zulu F.C. players
South African Premier Division players
Eliteserien players
Allsvenskan players
Major League Soccer players
Olympic soccer players of South Africa
Footballers at the 2000 Summer Olympics
2004 African Cup of Nations players
2006 Africa Cup of Nations players
South African expatriate soccer players
Expatriate footballers in Norway
Expatriate soccer players in the United States
Expatriate footballers in Sweden
South African expatriate sportspeople in Norway
South African expatriate sportspeople in the United States
South African expatriate sportspeople in Sweden
Association football forwards